Gray's lark (Ammomanopsis grayi) is a species of lark in the family Alaudidae.  It is found in south-western Africa in its natural habitat of hot deserts.

Taxonomy and systematics
Gray's lark was originally described as a species within the genus Alauda. It was then placed in the sister genus Ammomanes until re-classified in 2009 by the IOC into the monotypic genus Ammomanopsis. Some authorities still consider the species as Ammomanes grayi. Other names for Gray's lark include Gray's desert lark and Gray's sand lark.

Subspecies 
Two subspecies are recognized: 
 A. g. hoeschi - (Niethammer, 1955): Found in north-western Namibia and south-western Angola
 A. g. grayi - (Wahlberg, 1855): Found in west-central and south-western Namibia

References

Gray's lark
Birds of Southern Africa
Gray's lark
Gray's lark
Taxonomy articles created by Polbot